Automobiles Charron, Girardot & Voigt SA (trade mark C.G.V.) was a French motor manufacturer founded by the racing cyclists and motorists Fernand Charron, Léonce Girardot and Émile  Voigt.

History
They opened one of the first French car dealerships in 1897, on Avenue de la Grande Armée in Paris and raced Panhard et Levassors in the major motoring events. Automobiles Charron, Girardot et Voigt SA showed their first car in 1901. In 1904, they produced 216 cars with 4 cylinder engines, which sold for up to £1200 in England. In 1905, Voigt was sole importer to the USA of C.G.V. cars.

Automobiles Charron
Automobiles Charron, Girardot et Voigt SA became Automobiles Charron in 1906 when both Girardot and Voigt left, and it continued trading until 1930.

Motor-boats
In May 1905 Madame Camille du Gast competed in the trans-Mediterranean race from Algiers to Toulon, having built the  steel-hulled Camille specifically for the event, fitted with a 90-horsepower Charron, Girardot et Voigt  engine.

See also
 Charron (automobile)

References

Reading list 
 Harald Linz, Halwart Schrader: Die große Automobil-Enzyklopädie. BLV Verlagsgesellschaft, München 1986, . (German)

Defunct motor vehicle manufacturers of France
French companies established in 1897
Manufacturing companies established in 1897